Daniel Spagnou (born 22 September 1940 in Barcelonnette, Alpes-de-Haute-Provence) is a member of the National Assembly of France.  He represents the second constituency of Alpes-de-Haute-Provence department, and is a member of the Union for a Popular Movement.

Biography 
Daniel Spagnou worked as a savings bank manager, he is now retired.

He entered politics by becoming mayor of Sisteron on March 14, 1983. He still holds this position, his list having obtained 57% of the votes cast in 2020.

From April 15, 1985 to March 18, 2001, he was a member of the Alpes-de-Haute-Provence General Council. He was vice-president from 1988 to 2001.

For ten years, from March 23, 1992 to July 1, 2002, he was also a member of the Provence-Alpes-Côte d'Azur Regional Council, of which he was vice-president from 1992 to 1998.

On June 16, 2002, he was elected deputy for the 2nd constituency of Alpes-de-Haute-Provence for the 12th legislature (2002-2007). He beat outgoing MP Robert Honde, former PRG mayor of Manosque in the second round, collecting 59.91% of the vote in the second round.

He was re-elected deputy on June 17, 2007, for the 13th legislature (2007-2012), beating, in the second round, Christophe Castaner, the PS mayor of Forcalquier, with 53.97% of the vote. He sits in the UMP group. He belongs to the Committee on Cultural Affairs and is a member of the National Assembly delegation on women's rights and equal opportunities between men and women.

He is a member of the National Assembly's Tibet Study Group.

In January 2011, he announced on his site that he would not be a candidate in the 2012 legislative elections.

At the end of 2017, he joined Agir, the constructive right.

Titles 

 Officer of the Legion of Honour July 14, 2019.

 Knight of the Legion of Honour, 1999.

References

1940 births
Living people
People from Barcelonnette
Rally for the Republic politicians
Union for a Popular Movement politicians
The Popular Right
Deputies of the 12th National Assembly of the French Fifth Republic
Deputies of the 13th National Assembly of the French Fifth Republic